Zemin is a Chinese given name. People with this name include:

Au Tak (also Au Chak-mun; 1840–1920), Hong Kong entrepreneur
Mao Zemin (1896–1943), Chinese politician, younger brother of Mao Zedong
Shen Zemin (1900–1933), one of the earliest members of the Chinese Communist Party 
Chai Zemin (1916–2010), Chinese diplomat
Jiang Zemin (1926-2022), Chinese politician, former General Secretary of the Chinese Communist Party
Wong Jack Man (born c. 1940), Chinese martial artist
Liu Zemin (1944–2017), Chinese politician
Vince Matthew Chung (born 1976), Hong Kong Amazing Race Asia winner
Chu Tzer-ming, Taiwanese government official under President Tsai Ying-wen

See also
Zemina (surname)
Zemin (disambiguation)

Chinese given names